Pamela Butchart is a Scottish children's author and high school philosophy teacher. Butchart is best known for her books, The Spy Who Loved School Dinners and My Head Teacher is a Vampire Rat, both of which won book awards.

Education and career

Butchart has an MA in philosophy from the University of Dundee and a PGDE from the University of Edinburgh. After graduating, Butchart became a philosophy teacher at Harris Academy in Dundee.

She began writing children's books after her fiancé gave her a book on how to write for children. Butchart has said that Judith Kerr is one of her influences.

Butchart won the 2015 Blue Peter Book Award for Best story for her book, The Spy Who Loved School Dinners which was illustrated by Thomas Flintham.

In 2016, Butchart's book, My Teacher is a Vampire Rat won the Red House Children's Book Award in the Young Readers Category and for overall winner.

In 2017, it was announced that Butchart would write the sixteenth and seventeenth Secret Seven novels, the first additions to the series since 1963. The original series was written by Enid Blyton. The first book, called Mystery of the Skull, was published in July 2018 and the second, Mystery of the Theatre Ghost, was published in February 2019.

Personal life

Butchart lives in Broughty Ferry, Dundee with her husband, Andy Cunningham, whom she married in July 2014.

Bibliography

Pugly Series
Pugly Bakes a Cake illustrated by Gemma Correll (2016) 
Pugly Solves a Crime (2016) 
Pugly On Ice (2016) 

Baby Aliens Series
Baby Aliens Got My Teacher! (2014) 
The Spy who loved School Dinners (2014) 
My Head Teacher is a Vampire Rat illustrated by Thomas Flintham (2015) ASIN B00S46UFHU
Attack of the Demon Dinner Ladies illustrated by Thomas Flintham (2016) 
To Wee or Not to Wee illustrated by Thomas Flintham (2016) ASIN B01EYGLXNI
There's a Werewolf in My Tent! illustrated by Thomas Flintham (2017) 
The Phantom Lollipop Man! illustrated by Thomas Flintham (2018) ASIN B077T32TZK
There's a Yeti in the Playground! (2018)

Wigglesbottom Primary Series
Wigglesbottom Primary:The Toilet Ghost illustrated by Becka Moor (2014) 
Wigglesbottom Primary: The Shark in the Pool illustrated by Becka Moor (2015) 
Wigglesbottom Primary: The Magic Hamster illustrated by Becka Moor (2016) 
Wigglesbottom Primary: Super Dog! illustrated by Becka Moor (2017) 

Yikes Series
Yikes, Stinkysaurus! (2014) 
Yikes, Santasaurus! (2014) 
Yikes, Ticklysaurus! illustrated by Sam Lloyd (2015) ASIN B00XN8UG5U
Yikes, Santa-CLAWS! illustrated by Sam Lloyd (2015) 

Stand-alone books
Petunia Perry and the Curse of the Ugly Pigeon (2015) 
Never Tickle a Tiger illustrated by Marc Boutavant (2016)

References

Living people
Scottish women writers
Scottish children's writers
People from Broughty Ferry
Alumni of the University of Edinburgh
Alumni of the University of Dundee
Year of birth missing (living people)
Writers from Dundee